WBFC-LP (107.5 FM) is an American low-power FM radio station licensed to serve the community of Boynton, Georgia. The station is currently owned by Boynton Low Power Broadcasting, Inc.  It broadcasts a Southern gospel format.

References

External links
 

BFC-LP
BFC-LP
Southern Gospel radio stations in the United States
Radio stations established in 2004
2004 establishments in Georgia (U.S. state)
Catoosa County, Georgia